Samuela Drudru (born 30 April 1989) is a Fijian footballer who plays as a forward for Suva. He made his debut for the national team in August 2015 in their 5–0 victory against Tonga.

In 2017, Drudru started playing for Lautoka in the Fiji Premier League.

Club

International career

International goals
Scores and results list Fiji's goal tally first.

Honours

Club

Nadi
Fiji League: 2015

Lautoka
Fiji League: 2017
OFC Champions League: 2018: Runner-Up

References

External links
 
 

Living people
1989 births
Association football defenders
Fiji international footballers
Fijian footballers
Suva F.C. players
Nadi F.C. players